Benjamin Böckle (born 17 June 2002) is an Austrian professional footballer who plays as a defender for German  club Fortuna Düsseldorf.

Club career
On 17 June 2022, Böckle signed a three-year contract with Fortuna Düsseldorf in Germany.

Career statistics

Club

References

2002 births
Living people
Austrian footballers
Austria youth international footballers
Association football defenders
FC Liefering players
Fortuna Düsseldorf players
Fortuna Düsseldorf II players
2. Liga (Austria) players
Regionalliga players
Austrian expatriate footballers
Expatriate footballers in Germany
Austrian expatriate sportspeople in Germany